Valentin von der Mühll (1884–1929) was a footballer who played two seasons for FC Basel. He played mainly as a forward, but also as a midfielder.

Football career
Between 1916 and 1918 von der Mühll played at least five games for Basel, scoring once. Four of these games were in the Swiss Serie A and the other was a friendly game. He scored his only recorded goal in the domestic league on 3 March 1918 as Basel won 8–3 in the home game at the Landhof against FC Bern.

References

Sources
 Rotblau: Jahrbuch Saison 2017/2018. Publisher: FC Basel Marketing AG. 
 Die ersten 125 Jahre. Publisher: Josef Zindel im Friedrich Reinhardt Verlag, Basel. 
 Verein "Basler Fussballarchiv" Homepage

FC Basel players
Association football midfielders
Association football forwards
1884 births
1929 deaths
Swiss men's footballers